Birmingham Moseley was a constituency of the House of Commons of the Parliament of the United Kingdom from 1918 to 1950. It elected one Member of Parliament (MP) by the first-past-the-post system of election.

Boundaries 
1918–1945: The county borough of Birmingham wards of Acocks Green and Sparkhill, and parts of the wards of Balsall Heath, King's Norton, Moseley and King's Heath, and Sparkbrook.

Between 1885 and 1918 the parliamentary borough of Birmingham was split into seven single-member divisions. The Representation of the People Act 1918 provided for a redistribution of Birmingham into twelve constituencies, one of which was Birmingham Moseley. Moseley was the south-westernmost of the Birmingham seats established in 1918.

1945–1950: The county borough of Birmingham wards of Moseley and King's Heath, and Sparkhill, and the part of the King's Norton ward in the existing constituency.

By the 1935 United Kingdom general election, the electorate of the Moseley division exceeded 100,000 voters. Towards the end of the Second World War it was decided to instruct the Boundary Commission for England to prepare a scheme to divide the seats with more than 100,000 voters. This was provided for by the House of Commons (Redistribution of Seats) Act 1944, as an interim measure before the first general review of all the constituencies took place later in the decade.

At the 1945 United Kingdom general election, the constituency was divided into two. The Acock's Green and Hall Green wards became part of the new seat of Birmingham Acock's Green. The remainder of the previous Moseley remained as that division.

As a result of the first general review, the Moseley division disappeared at the 1950 United Kingdom general election.

Members of Parliament

Elections

Elections in the 1910s

Elections in the 1920s

Elections in the 1930s 

General Election 1939–40

Another General Election was required to take place before the end of 1940. The political parties had been making preparations for an election to take place and by the Autumn of 1939, the following candidates had been selected; 
Conservative: Patrick Hannon
Labour: Miss J S Wells

Elections in the 1940s

References

 Boundaries of Parliamentary Constituencies 1885-1972, compiled and edited by F.W.S. Craig (Parliamentary Reference Publications 1972)
 
 

Parliamentary constituencies in Birmingham, West Midlands (historic)
Constituencies of the Parliament of the United Kingdom established in 1918
Constituencies of the Parliament of the United Kingdom disestablished in 1950